WPVN-CD (channel 24) is a low-powered, Class A television station in Chicago, Illinois, United States. The station is owned by Innovate Corp. WPVN-CD's studios are located on West Belmont Avenue in northwest Chicago, and its transmitter is located atop the Trump International Hotel and Tower in downtown Chicago.

History
The station became a Retro TV affiliate for the Chicago television market on November 13, 2010 (through June 30, 2013), but the main purpose of the station is to relocate much of the ethnic programming removed by Weigel Broadcasting in December 2010 when they decided to end carrying it over to WCIU-DT6.

On March 28, 2011, WPVN-CA applied to move its transmitting facilities to the Trump International Hotel and Tower from its current analog and digital locations. The application was approved on August 31, 2011, along with getting Class A digital status on October 7, 2011.

In July 2016, a 24-hour broadcast of JBTV replaced KBS World on channel 24.7.

On May 25, 2018, HC2 Holdings announced it would purchase WPVN-CD for $7 million plus costs.). If the purchase is approved and the station does go on the air, it is likely to become an owned-and-operated station of HC2's network Azteca América, which currently broadcasts on WCHU-LD (channel 61). With Polvision also selling off Milwaukee sister station WPVS-LP (channel 29) (which has yet to launch in eight years since Polvision's purchase of the license), the company will complete a withdrawal from over-the-air television broadcasting ownership, though retains control of WPVN's fourth subchannel.

Subchannels
The station's digital signal is multiplexed:

References

PVN-CD
Low-power television stations in the United States
PVN-CD
Television channels and stations established in 1987
1987 establishments in Illinois
Innovate Corp.